CAVOK or Cavok can refer to:

An abbreviation for Ceiling and Visibility OK, used in METARs
CAVOK Air, a Ukrainian cargo airline established in 2011
Hatherleigh CAVOK, a motorglider